Datisca cannabina, called false hemp, is a species of flowering plant in the genus Datisca, family Datiscaceae, native to the Aegean Islands, Crete, Cyprus, Anatolia, the Levant, the Transcaucasus, Iraq, Iran, Central Asia, Afghanistan, Pakistan, the western Himalayas and Nepal. It is one of the very few species known to have true androdioecy, meaning it has a mix of male and hermaphroditic individuals. 

It is hardy but prefers a sheltered position in full sun or partial shade.

Local artisans use its roots to produce a fast yellow dye.

References

Datiscaceae
Taxa named by Carl Linnaeus
Plants described in 1753